Alexey Limanzo, President of the Association of Indigenous Peoples of North Sakhalin Region, is the chairman of the council of the indigenous people plenipotentiary of Sakhalin Island.

See also
 Nivkh people

References

External links
 Press release of The Sakhalin Association of Indigenous Peoples of the North

Living people
Anti-corporate activism
Russian politicians
Russian environmentalists
Year of birth missing (living people)